Frans Oskar Rapola (23 December 1862, Sääksmäki - 20 March 1910) was a Finnish secondary school teacher and politician. He was a member of the Parliament of Finland from 1907 until his death in 1910, representing the Finnish Party.

References

1862 births
1910 deaths
People from Valkeakoski
People from Häme Province (Grand Duchy of Finland)
Finnish Party politicians
Members of the Parliament of Finland (1907–08)
Members of the Parliament of Finland (1908–09)
Members of the Parliament of Finland (1909–10)
Members of the Parliament of Finland (1910–11)
University of Helsinki alumni